Pudhu Kudithanam is a 1999 Tamil-language comedy film directed by R. Raghuvasan, who previously directed Thilakam. The film stars Vignesh and Raasi, with Latha, Manivannan, Senthil, Kovai Sarala and Shanmugasundari playing supporting roles. It was released on 7 November 1999.

Plot

Seethalakshmi is the owner of a clothing company, she is a haughty and strict woman. Her husband Gokulakrishnan is unemployed, while her son Ashok works as a labourer in another company. Both of them are very obedient to Seethalakshmi.

Seethalakshmi would like an equally submissive daughter-in-law so that she will not influence her son, but Gokulakrishnan has another plan : he wants his son to marry a woman that he really loves. Gokulakrishnan incites his son to fall in love. As his wish, Ashok falls in love with Nila who works in his mother's company and Nila also reciprocates his feelings. Nila has no parents and she was brought up by her grandmother. They then secretly get married with the blessing of Gokulakrishnan. Ashok and Gokulakrishnan decide to hide the secret marriage from Seethalakshmi. Ashok is now living a double life as an unmarried submissive son and as a happy husband, Ashok goes to his wife's home the night and returns to his parents' home well before dawn. Meanwhile, Nila and Seethalakshmi become friends without knowing that they are related to each other. What transpires next forms the rest of the story.

Cast

Vignesh as Ashok
Raasi as Nila
Latha as Seethalakshmi, Ashok's mother
Manivannan as Gokulakrishnan, Ashok's father
Senthil as Azhagu
Kovai Sarala as Sarasu
Shanmugasundari
Kumarimuthu
Vennira Aadai Moorthy as Kalyanasundaram
King Kong as Aruva Velu
Tirupur Ramaswamy as Marriage Broker
Bayilvan Ranganathan as Inspector Kalivardhan
Ramji
Babilona
Singamuthu
Omakuchi Narasimhan

Soundtrack

The film score and the soundtrack were composed by Deva. The soundtrack, released in 1999, features 5 tracks with lyrics written by Arivumathi, Pazhani Bharathi, Ponniyin Selvan, Thamarai and the film director R. Raghuvasan.

Release
A critic from Sify.com noted "the film fails to raise any laughs and is worth seeing only if one is interested in viewing Mantra ooze "oomph" on screen".

Director Raghuvasan later began making a film directed Puducherry in 2007, but the film did not have a theatrical release.

References

1999 films
1990s Tamil-language films
Films scored by Deva (composer)
Indian comedy films
1999 directorial debut films
1999 comedy films